Edmund Alexander de Schweinitz (20 March 1825 – 18 December 1887) was an American bishop of the Moravian Church.

Biography
De Schweinitz was born at Bethlehem, Pennsylvania, and studied theology at the Moravian College there and at Berlin. He entered the ministry in 1850 and after some years of pastoral life, became in 1870 Bishop of the Moravian church. He founded the Moravian, the weekly journal of his Church, in 1856 and for 10 years was its editor. He was the author of:
 The Moravian Manual (1859)
 The Moravian Episcopate (1865)
 The Life and Times of David Zeisberger (1870)
 Some of the Fathers of the Moravian Church (1881)
 The History of the Church Known as the Unitas Fratrum; or, The Unity of the Brethren, Founded by the Followers of John Hus (1885)

References

:de:Kategorie:Korporierter im Wingolf

1825 births
1887 deaths
Writers from Bethlehem, Pennsylvania
Moravian University alumni
American religious writers
American bishops
19th-century Moravian bishops
American people of the Moravian Church
19th-century American clergy